SEEP2D is a 2D seepage analysis program written by Dr. Fred Tracy of the United States Army Corps of Engineers. The program is used to analyze water seepage, typically through dams and levees or under  sheet piles. "The model is internationally known in the 
engineering community as a model for complicated seepage analysis of dams and levees."
It has been shown to have acceptable accuracy compared with experimental results.

Features
SEEP2D has the following features:

 Steady-state
 2D profiles (XZ)
  Finite-element unstructured mesh
 Confined or unconfined models
 Automatic mesh truncation on phreatic surface (optional)
 Flow modeling in both saturated and unsaturated regions (optional)
 Support for nonhomogeneous and anisotropic soil conditions
 Output of total head, flow vectors
 Output of everything necessary to create a flownet

Related software
 GMS - has a pre and post processor for SEEP2D.
 UTEXAS - slope stability analysis software that can use SEEP2D results.

References

Geotechnical engineering software
Hydrogeology software